Reportase (Reportage) is the flagship television newscast aired on Indonesian television network Trans TV from 2003 until 2016. The slogan is Lebih Dekat dan Berbeda (Closer and Different).

The program is broadcast in the morning (as Reportase Pagi), evening (as Reportase Sore), night (as Reportase Malam), and formerly in the afternoon (as Reportase Siang). During weekends, the evening newscast is replaced with Reportase Investigasi, an in-depth, investigative news magazine about various frauds, usually dealing with food safety.

The last edition of Reportase aired on May 29, 2016, as it was replaced with CNN Indonesia-based newscasts the next day.

External links
 Reportase on Twitter

Indonesian television news shows
2003 Indonesian television series debuts
2016 Indonesian television series endings
2000s Indonesian television series
2010s Indonesian television series
Trans TV original programming